National Highway 26B (NH 26B), is a National Highway in India that runs entirely within the states of Maharashtra and Madhya Pradesh. The northern terminal is in Narsinghpur and the southern terminal is in Savner.

Major cities en route 
Savner, Sausar, Chhindwara, Amarwara, and Narsinghpur

See also

 List of National Highways in India (by Highway Number)
 National Highways Development Project

References

External links
B-driving-directions-map.html NH 26-B Map

26-B
26-B
National highways in India (old numbering)